Dulux is an internationally available brand of architectural paint originated from the United Kingdom. The brand name Dulux has been used by both Imperial Chemical Industries (ICI) and DuPont since 1931 and was one of the first alkyd-based paints. It is produced by AkzoNobel (originally produced by ICI prior to 2008) although the United States markets are now served by PPG Industries.

History

In the early days of its existence, decorators and their suppliers were the main customers for Dulux, with Say Dulux to your decorator used as an advertising slogan in the 1950s. By 1953, Dulux was available in the retail market and ten years later the famous Old English Sheepdog was used in advertisements, to the point where "Dulux dog" has become a common nickname for the breed.

The name Dulux is derived from the words Durable and Luxury. In May 2010, Dulux launched the 'Let's Colour Project', a global marketing campaign featuring the painting of public spaces with bright colours.

Dulux dog

The Old English Sheepdog is the brand mascot for Dulux paint. The dog was first introduced in advertising campaigns in 1961. Since then they have been a constant and highly popular feature of Dulux television and print adverts wherever the paint is sold. So much so, that many people in those markets refer to the breed as a 'Dulux dog' rather than a Sheepdog.

Over the years, different dogs have appeared in the adverts. However, they all look very similar, due to the carefully managed selection process carried out by ICI's advertising agency. The first Dulux dog was Shepton Daphnis Horsa, pet name Dash, who held the role for eight years, owned by Eva Sharp in Tottenham. His successor, Fernville Lord Digby, was the most famous Dulux dog and also made his owners, Cynthia and Norman Harrison, famous. 

When filming advertisements, Digby was treated like a star, being driven to the studio in a chauffeur driven car. Barbara Woodhouse was employed to train Digby and his three stunt doubles, who were used whenever specific tricks or actions needed to be filmed. Digby's popularity led him to play the title role in the 1973 British comedy film Digby, the Biggest Dog in the World.

Gambit - another Dulux dog, was used in a photographic shoot in 1980 for Philips Video and its new generation of video recorders. By the time the shoot was finished, there was enough hair to fill a mattress - the dog was constantly groomed during the shoot. King Hotspur of Amblegait was used from 1974 to 1979 and appeared in over fifty television programmes as well as his public appearances for ICI/Dulux.

Apart from Dash, all the Dulux dogs have been breed champions, and five of them have won 'Best in Show' prizes.

The Dulux dog was placed at No. 51 in Channel 4's "100 Greatest Television Adverts".

Dulux in Australia and New Zealand
In Australia and  New Zealand , Dulux has been involved with the manufacture and marketing of paint and related products since 1904 and is the largest manufacturer of paint products in Australia. 

Dulux had its origins in H. L. Vosz, a large glass fabrication business and Australia's first major paint manufacturer. In 1912, the Australasian United Paint Company Limited was founded in South Australia, with an office in Lipson Street, Port Adelaide, to take over the paint business of H. L. Vosz as a going concern, and over the next few years the factory underwent significant modernization. The glass business continued independently under the Vosz name (although its founder had died nearly 30 years previously), but became Clarkson Ltd in 1915, in response to anti-German sentiment.

In 1919, the Australasian United Paint Co was purchased for £40,000 by British Australian Lead Manufacturers, a consortium of British white lead manufacturers, with their Australian office in Melbourne or in Sydney. The company became BALM Paints In the 1950s, it opened a new factory and Central Research Labs in Clayton, Victoria.
 
Taking its cue from survey evidence that the Australian public had no idea what BALM Paints was, but that everyone knew Dulux, the company changed its name in 1971 to Dulux Australia. In the course of the 1970s, it acquired Walpamur Paints. Its main rivals at that time were British Paints and Berger Paints.

In 1988, Dulux acquired both British and Berger Paints. By 1996, it had also acquired Cabot's. The Australian paint market was then dominated by Wattyl, Taubmans and Dulux.

Until 1997, Dulux Australia was a key player in the ICI Paints World Group, after which ICI informed ICI Australia of its intention to sell its 62% share in the company as part of raising the capital needed for acquisition of part of Unilever. The former ICI Australia became an independent company on 2 February 1998 and was named Orica. In Australia and New Zealand, Dulux was wholly owned by Orica until July 2010, when DuluxGroup was spun off as a separate company on the Australian Securities Exchange. Fairground Attraction's song "Perfect" was used for an advertisement on television.

Dulux Australia was formerly a major player in all paint markets (decorative, automotive, refinish, industrial, powder coatings), but sold off the technical markets (and the Clayton site) to PPG Industries, concentrating on decorative, woodcare and powder coatings, and moving to a new site on Dandenong Road, Clayton, previously owned by Pond's.

Television advertisements featured the Dulux Dog (Penny), and several hundred other Old English Sheepdogs, racing around collecting cricket stumps, drumsticks, wooden spoons, sticks, and other items, to stir a newly opened pot of Dulux "Wash and Wear" paint. The accompanying music was "I Woke Up Today", by American band Port O'Brien, from the album "All We Could Do Was Sing".

In August 2019, DuluxGroup was acquired by Nippon Paint and delisted from the Australian Securities Exchange.

Dulux in Canada
The Dulux decorative paint business In Canada was sold to the PPG Architectural Coatings division of PPG Industries in December 2012.

Dulux Decorator Centre
In the United Kingdom, AkzoNobel operates the trade and retail store chain of Dulux Decorator Centre. There are now over 200 branches, predominantly in England, though there are more than twenty in Scotland, with six in Wales and four in Northern Ireland. Offering the Dulux Trade brand along with other AkzoNobel brands such as Armstead, Hammerite, and Cuprinol, it is also a supplier of decorating accessories, wallpaper and workwear from a large number of other manufacturers.

Dulux Select Decorators
The Dulux Select Decorators scheme is a nationwide network of professional decorators. The concept was originated by Dulux in 1996 to assure consumers of high-quality work including a two-year guarantee supported by the leading paint manufacturing brand.

Dulux Trade Contract Partnership
Dulux Trade Contract Partnership is a scheme for independently assessed, quality assured contractors. Dulux Trade Contract Partners undergo regular site visits by independent scheme assessors to monitor standards and to identify opportunities for improvement.

References

External links

 

British brands
Companies formerly listed on the Australian Securities Exchange
Imperial Chemical Industries
Paint and coatings companies of Australia
Paint and coatings companies of the United Kingdom